E2, e2, E02, E.II, e or E-2 may refer to:

Biology and medicine 
 Ubiquitin-conjugating enzyme, a protein component of proteasome-mediated protein degradation
 E2 regulatory sequence for the insulin gene
 Levuglandin E2
 Prostaglandin E2, an abortifacient
 Prostaglandin E2 receptor, a human gene
 E02 : Subclinical iodine-deficiency hypothyroidism ICD-10 code
 Estradiol (Oestradiol)
 Dihydrolipoyl transacetylase, the second element of the multienzyme pyruvate dehydrogenase complex
 Acireductone dioxygenase (iron(II)-requiring), an enzyme

Mathematics and technology 
 E2 (cipher), a block cipher submitted to the AES competition by NTT
 E2 reaction, a type of organic reaction
 Honda E2, one of the predecessors of Honda's ASIMO robot
 Motorola ROKR E2, a smartphone
 Tungsten E2, a business-class Palm OS-based handheld computer
 E2, a communications channel defined in the E-carrier standard
 Shure E2 (sometimes called E2c) canalphones
 Everything2, a collaborative web-based community consisting of a database of interlinked user-submitted written material
 E2 or E2 is an old name for the exceptional group G2 (mathematics)

Music 
 E (album), a 2007 album by Eros Ramazzotti

Television 
 "E²", an episode of Star Trek: Enterprise
 e2 visa, E2 investor visa is a non-immigrant visa for investors, entrepreneurs, and those who want to run a business in the United States.
 MTV e2, a Canadian entertainment news program that airs on MTV Canada
 E2 (TV channel), a Turkish TV channel
 e2 by SKY PerfecTV!, a satellite television service in Japan operated by SKY Perfect

Transport

Aircraft 
 Northrop Grumman E-2 Hawkeye, an American carrier-based AWACS aircraft 
 Fokker E.II, a 1915 German single-seat monoplane fighter aircraft
 Pfalz E.II, a German aircraft powered by the Oberursel U.I engine
 Taylor E-2, a small, light and simple utility aircraft
 Embraer E-Jet E2 family, an updated version of the E-jet family
 Eastman E-2 Sea Rover, a 1920s seaplane

Rail 
 E2 Series Shinkansen, a Japanese high-speed train
 EMC E2, an early American passenger-train diesel locomotive
 LB&SCR E2 class, a class of 0-6-0T steam locomotives designed by Lawson Billington. Also the basis for Thomas the Tank Engine.
 PRR E2, an American PRR 4-4-2 locomotive
 CNW Class E-2, a class of 4-6-2 steam locomotives built by the American Locomotive Company in 1923

Roads and footpaths 
 E02, Colombo–Katunayake Expressway in Sri Lanka
 E2 European long distance path, a long-distance footpath that runs from Galway in Ireland to France's Mediterranean coast
 E2, the North–South Expressway Southern Route in Malaysia
 E002, a European B-class route in Azerbaijan and Armenia
 E2 expressway (Philippines), expressway route in the Philippines, which includes Metro Manila Skyway, South Luzon Expressway, and Southern Tagalog Arterial Road
 Sanyo Expressway, Hiroshiwa-Iwakuni Road, Ogori Road and Yamaguchi-Ube Road, route E2 in Japan.

Submarines 
 HMS E2, an E-class submarine of the Royal Navy
 USS E-2 (SS-25), an E-class submarine of the United States Navy

Other transport-related 
 Kampuchea Airlines IATA code
 London Buses route E2

Other uses 
 E-2 visa, a type of visa which allows an individual to enter and work in the United States based on an investment he or she will be controlling, while inside the United States
 E-2 South Korean visa, a South Korean language teaching visa
 E2, a postcode district in the E postcode area for east London
 Private E-2, a paygrade for the rank of Private in the U.S. Army
 E2 (nightclub), a nightclub in Chicago
 Eternity II puzzle, a puzzle competition
 E-II Holdings, Inc., an investment holding company formerly owned by Meshulam Riklis, and later by Carl Icahn
 E2 grade, an assessment of difficulty in rock climbing
 E2 elimination, a mechanism of Elimination reaction in chemistry.
 Haplogroup E2 (Y-DNA), a human Y-chromosome DNA haplogroup

See also 
 2E (disambiguation)
 EII (disambiguation)